Jack Willie Lipitoa  (born ) is a Niuean politician and Member of the Niue Assembly. He is the older brother of former Cabinet Minister Enetama Lipitoa.

Lipitoa worked as a teacher, first at Matalave and then at Niue High School. He was first elected to the Niuean Assembly at the 1987 Niuean general election, replacing his brother who had moved to a seat on the common roll. He has been re-elected at every election since.

Honours
Lipitoa was awarded the Queen's Service Medal in the 1999 Queen's Birthday Honours. At the 2021 Niue National Awards, he was awarded the Niue Distinguished Service Cross.

References

Living people
Year of birth missing (living people)
Niuean educators
Members of the Niue Assembly
Recipients of the Niue Distinguished Service Cross